Therese Hughes MBE is a Northern Ireland hairdresser in Newry, County Down.

Career
Hughes provides a wig boutique service for patients suffering hair loss as a result of treatment for cancer, alopecia and for various other reasons. She was awarded a MBE in the 2008 Honours List in recognition of her work with patients in The City Hospital, Belfast, Northern Ireland.  Hughes owned several hairdressing salons before deciding to exclusively focus her expertise in providing wigs and hairpieces. She decided to launch this service in Northern Ireland after watching a woman going through the distress of hair loss following chemotherapy for breast cancer. Hughes has now extended her service to the Republic of Ireland in conjunction with the Gary Kelly Cancer Support Centre in Drogheda, County Louth.

Hughes had a BBC documentary made about her work titled "My Wig and Me." It was broadcast on BBC 1 Northern Ireland in October 2016 under True North series 7.

References

Year of birth missing (living people)
Living people
British hairdressers
Members of the Order of the British Empire
People from Newry